Daundre Barnaby (9 December 1990 – 27 March 2015) was a Canadian track runner who specialised in the 400m. Born in Jamaica, he competed for the Mississippi State Bulldogs and ran for Canada at the 2012 Summer Olympics in London, finishing 6th in his heat in the 400m.  He also competed for Canada at the 2014 Commonwealth Games, reaching the semifinals.

Barnaby disappeared on March 27, 2015 while swimming in the ocean at a training camp in Saint Kitts, and was declared dead later that same day.

His personal best time in the 400 metres was 45.47 seconds, achieved in May 2013 in Greensboro, NC.

References

External links
 

1990 births
2015 deaths
People from Saint Ann Parish
Canadian male sprinters
Black Canadian track and field athletes
Jamaican emigrants to Canada
Athletes (track and field) at the 2012 Summer Olympics
Olympic track and field athletes of Canada
Commonwealth Games competitors for Canada
Athletes (track and field) at the 2014 Commonwealth Games
Deaths by drowning
Accidental deaths in Saint Kitts and Nevis
Mississippi State Bulldogs men's track and field athletes